Maura B. Mast is an Irish-American mathematician, mathematics educator, and academic administrator, specializing in differential geometry and quantitative reasoning. With Ethan D. Bolker, she is the author of the textbook Common Sense Mathematics. Mast is dean of Fordham College at Rose Hill, part of Fordham University.

Early life and education
Mast is the daughter of Cecil B. Mast (1927–2008), a mathematics professor at the University of Notre Dame in South Bend, Indiana. Her mother was Irish, and Mast has dual Irish and American citizenship. She grew up in South Bend and did her undergraduate studies at Notre Dame, with a double major in mathematics and anthropology.

She completed her doctorate in mathematics in 1992 at the University of North Carolina at Chapel Hill. Her dissertation, Closed Geodesics in 2-step Nilmanifolds, concerned the differential geometry of geodesics on curved surfaces, and was supervised by Pat Eberlein.

Career
Mast became a faculty member at the University of Northern Iowa in 1992.
After visiting professorships at Northeastern University and Wellesley College, she moved to the University of Massachusetts Boston in 1998. There, in 2009, she became associate vice provost for undergraduate studies. In 2015 she came to Fordham University as the first female dean of Fordham College at Rose Hill.
In 2022 she earned and was promoted to rank of full Professor at Fordham University.

Activism
Mast has been an active member of the Clavius Group, a group of Jesuit and lay mathematicians, and is a strong supporter of the Jesuit vision of Catholic spirituality.

She has also been a passionate advocate for the advancement of women in mathematics and science, which she writes is "crucial for the future of the country and for women". She has participated in the governance of the Association for Women in Mathematics as Clerk and Executive Committee member of the association.

Mast was chair of the Special Interest Group on Quantitative Literacy of the Mathematical Association of America for 2006–2007.

Books
Common Sense Mathematics (with Ethan D. Bolker, Mathematical Association of America, 2016)
Women in Mathematics: Celebrating the Centennial of the Mathematical Association of America (edited with Janet Beery, Sarah J. Greenwald, and Jacqueline Jensen-Vallin, Springer, 2017)

Recognition
In 2017 Mast was given the Association for Women in Mathematics Service Award.
The Association for Women in Mathematics has included Mast in the 2020 class of AWM Fellows for "her sustained and deep contributions to promoting and encouraging the participation of women in the mathematical sciences through AWM, the Joint Committee on Women, the MAA, and through leadership in academia".

References

Year of birth missing (living people)
Living people
20th-century American mathematicians
21st-century American mathematicians
Irish mathematicians
American women mathematicians
People from South Bend, Indiana
University of Notre Dame alumni
University of North Carolina at Chapel Hill alumni
University of Northern Iowa faculty
Wellesley College faculty
University of Massachusetts Boston faculty
Fordham University faculty
Fellows of the Association for Women in Mathematics
20th-century American women
21st-century American women